Monolithos, Poems 1962 and 1982 is the second book of poetry by American poet Jack Gilbert. It was nominated for all three major American book awards: the National Book Critics Circle Award, the Pulitzer Prize for Poetry, and the National Book Award. The same year Monolithos was published, Gilbert's partner Michiko Nogami died of cancer.

Overview
Released by Alfred A. Knopf in a 1982 hardcover edition, Monolithos came twenty years after Views of Jeopardy, which won Gilbert the Yale Series of Younger Poets Competition in 1962.  

A subsequent paperback edition of Monolithos was released by Graywolf Press in 1984. However, the limited availability of this edition has caused the book's value to climb from its original six-dollar publication price to amounts between $100 and $250, depending on the seller. 

The book is divided into two sections: One - 1962 contains revised and collected poems from Views of Jeopardy, while Two [Monolithos] 1982 consists of new poems, written mainly on the Greek islands of Paros and Santorini. Gilbert stayed there with the poet Linda Gregg during their marriage.

Of the title, Gilbert writes in the foreword, "Monolithos means single stone, and refers to the small hill behind our house which gave the place we lived its name. It is the tip of a non-igneous stone island buried in debris when most of Thira blew apart 3,500 years ago."

Poems in Monolithos

One * 1962
The Abnormal Is Not Courage
Between Poems
Perspective He Would Mutter Going to Bed
And She Waiting
Don Giovanni On His Way to Hell
The Plundering of Circe
Island and Figs
On Growing Old In San Francisco
County Musician
I'll Try to Explain About the Fear
Rain
Poetry Is a Kind of Lying
It May Be No One Should Be Opened
New York, Summer
In Dispraise of Poetry
Susanna and the Elders
For Example
The Night Comes Every Day to My Window
The Sirens Again
Before Morning in Perugia
Orpheus in Greenwich Village
Alba
Ostinato Rigore
A Bird Sings to Establish Frontiers
Bartleby at the Wall
The Whiteness, the Sound, and Alcibiades

Two * [Monolithos] * 1982
All the Way From There to Here
Not Part of Literature
Trying to Be Married
Registration
More Than Friends
That Tenor of Which the Night Birds Are a Vehicle
Walking Home Across the Island
Mistrust of Bronze
Angelus
A Kind of World
Leaving Monolithos
Divorce
Remembering My Wife
Pewter
Night After Night
Hunger
Sects
They Call It Attempted Suicide
Miniscus
Who's There
Meaning Well
Template
Siege
Translation Into the Original
Burning and Fathering: Accounts of My Country
The Fashionable Heart
Breakfast
Losing
The Rainy Forests of Northern California
Il Mio Tesoro
Don Giovanni in Trouble
The Movies
Byzantium Burning
They Will Put My Body Into the Ground
Love Poem
Elephant Hunt in Guadalajara
Pavane
Loyalty
Song
Getting Ready
Sur Ponticello
The Cucumbers of Praxilla of Sicyon
A Description of Happiness in København
New Hampshire Marble
My Marriage With Mrs. Johnson
Heart Skidding
Games
My Graveyard in Tokyo
Alone on Christmas Eve in Japan
Textures
The Revolution
Mexico
Another Grandfather
Singing in My Difficult Mountains
Threshing the Fire

References

1982 poetry books
American poetry collections